UKTV Car of the Year 2007 is a television program broadcast on Dave on 18 November 2007. It was presented by Andy Goldstein, who was assisted by experts Jason Plato and Louise Brady. Also there were motoring journalists Nick Biggs, Mike Rutherford & Alastair Weaver.

The vote was compiled on the channel's interactive service and its website. The journalists compiled a shortlist of 50 cars, which the voters narrowed down to 15. The 5 categories were: Luxury, Sports, Supermini, 4x4 & Family.

Results

There were 3 cars in each of the 5 categories and the winner of each is in bold.

Luxury: Bentley Continental GT, Audi S8, Maserati Quattroporte
Sports: Aston Martin V8 Vantage, Audi R8, Mercedes-Benz SLR McLaren
Supermini: Mini Cooper, Suzuki Swift Sport, Vauxhall Corsa
4x4: Audi Q7, Land Rover Defender, Land Rover Freelander
Family: Ford S-MAX, Mercedes-Benz C-Class, Ford Mondeo
Overall Winner: Audi R8 (by around 100 votes from the Ford Mondeo)

2007 British television series debuts
2007 British television series endings
Automotive television series